Bieri or Biery  is a surname. Notable people with these surnames include:

Bieri
Lydia Bieri (born 1972), Swiss-American mathematician and physicist
Maya Pedersen-Bieri, Swiss skeleton racer
Martin Bieri (born 1961), Swiss wheelchair curler, 2010 Winter Paralympian
Peter Bieri (author) (born 1944), Swiss author
Peter Bieri (politician) (born 1952), Swiss politician
Ramon Bieri, American actor

Biery
Edward A. Biery, American film editor
James Biery, American organist, composer and conductor
James Soloman Biery, American politician